Virginia Beach, or variants on the same, may refer to:
 Virginia Beach, Virginia 
 Virginia Beach Town Center
 Virginia Beach Oceanfront
 Virginia Beach, Virginia metropolitan area
 Virginia Beach Airport (FAA LID 42VA)
 Virginia Beach Boulevard, a major connector highway in Virginia
 Virginia Beach Expressway, part of the I-264 in Virginia
 Virginia Beach Open, a golf tournament
 2019 Virginia Beach shooting, a shooting incident on 31 May 2019